Kenneth Gyang is a young filmmaker in Nigeria and was born in Barkin Ladi of Plateau State, Nigeria.
He studied Film Production at the National Film Institute in Jos and screenwriting at Gaston Kaboré's IMAGINE in Ouagadougou, Burkina Faso. Two of his short films as well as a script titled "Game of Life" were selected for the Berlinale Talent Campus 2006 and "Mummy Lagos" was well received as an official competition entry.  "Mummy Lagos" was also selected for the Sithengi Talent Campus as part of the Cape Town World Cinema Festival in South Africa.

Honors and awards
His film "Omule" won Best Documentary Film at the 1st Nigerian Students International Film Festival in 2006 and "Mummy Lagos" also won Best Film at the Nigerian Field Society Awards organised by the German Cultural Centre, Goethe-Institut, in Lagos as well as the Jury Special Mention at the ANIWA festival in Ghana.

In 2006 he was profiled by the influential UK-based BFM magazine as the youngest film director in Nigeria.
Kenneth has worked with the BBC World Service Trust directing their highly quality TV drama "Wetin Dey" which was recently presented at the International Emmy World Television Festival in New York City. He has also worked with Communicating For Change as an Associate Producer on Bayelsian Silhouettes- a series of seven short films on HIV/AIDS.
His most recent work is Finding Aisha, a TV series he co-wrote, produced and directed for the Nigerian production company Televista.

In 2013, his debut feature film Confusion Na Wa produced by Tom Rowland Rees won the top gong - Best Film - at the Africa Motion Awards in Bayelsa.
Kenneth also won The Future Awards 2013 Prize In Arts & Culture.
He directed the AMAA award-winning film Blood and Henna about Meningitis in Northern Nigeria.

Kenneths Feature Film confusion Na Wa was highly acclaimed and went ahead to win the AMAA Awards 2013 for Best Film and Best Nigerian film, also the film went ahead in 2014 to win Nollywood Movie Award for Best Cinematography (Yinka Edwards) and Nollywood Movie Award for Best Director (Kenneth Gyang).

References

External links
https://web.archive.org/web/20090504094243/http://tdb.berlinale-talentcampus.de/campus/talent/kenneth-gyang/profile
HighBeam
http://www.africine.org/?menu=art&no=7066
http://www.nollywood.net/vbee/showthread.php?t=880
https://web.archive.org/web/20120626091709/http://sunnewsonline.com/webpages/features/arts/2006/mar/15/arts-15-03-2006-001.htm
http://culiblog.org/2006/02/food-related-film-at-the-berlin-international-film-festival/
https://web.archive.org/web/20090503025051/http://www.berlinale-talentcampus.de/story/48/1748.html

Year of birth missing (living people)
Living people
Nigerian film directors
People from Plateau State
Nigerian film actors
Nigerian entertainment industry businesspeople